The 1892 Kansas gubernatorial election was held on November 8, 1892. People's Party nominee Lorenzo D. Lewelling defeated Republican nominee Abram W. Smith with 50.04% of the vote.

General election

Candidates
Major party candidates 
Abram W. Smith, Republican

Other candidates
Lorenzo D. Lewelling, People's
I.O. Pickering, Prohibition

Results

References

1892
Kansas
Gubernatorial